is 2011 Japanese drama film based on the manga series of the same name by Minoru Furuya and directed by Sion Sono. The word himizu is the Japanese name for a species of mole. The film competed in competition at the 68th Venice International Film Festival in September. At the festival, Shōta Sometani and Fumi Nikaidō received the Marcello Mastroianni Award for Best New Young Actor and Actress for their work in the film.

Cast
 Shōta Sometani as Yuichi Sumida
 Fumi Nikaidō as Keiko Shazawa
 Megumi Kagurazaka
 Asuka Kurosawa
 Denden
 Mitsuru Fukikoshi
 Tetsu Watanabe
 Makiko Watanabe
 Ken Mitsuishi
 Jun Murakami
 Yōsuke Kubozuka as Teruhiko
 Yuriko Yoshitaka as Miki
 Takahiro Nishijima as You
 Anne Suzuki as Waitress

Production

Development
The director Sion Sono had already written the film's script when the Tōhoku earthquake and tsunami struck Japan on 11 March 2011. After this disaster, he decided to rewrite the script to adapt the film to this disaster.

Casting
The lead stars of the film were officially announced on 10 June 2011. The lead actor for the film is Shōta Sometani, who plays the role of Sumida, a 15-year-old who suffers from the violence that his father inflicted onto him. Actress Fumi Nikaidō his co-star, plays Chazawa, a rich girl who is Sumida's classmate.

Additional cast members of the film are Yōsuke Kubozuka, Yuriko Yoshitaka, Anne Suzuki and singer Takahiro Nishijima. Actress Yoshitaka previously starred in the 2006 film Noriko's Dinner Table, which was also directed by Sion Sono. Nishijima is from the music group AAA, and also previously starred in Sion Sono's 2009 award-winning film Love Exposure.

Filming
Most of the filming took place at a special set in Ibaraki Prefecture during May 2011.

Reception

Critical reception
Himizu currently holds a 94% approval rating on Rotten Tomatoes. The film was a New York Times Critics' Pick, with Miriam Bale praising its sound design and noting Sono "uses sound, a low, grumbling noise like an earthquake, to convey [dystopian Japan]. He also gives the film a harrowing cacophony and a sense of trauma with sound effects, including subtle echoes." Deborah Young of The Hollywood Reporter criticized the film as being "fraught with brutal violence and needless repetition that draws out its two-hour running time" and added that the film "is still not an easy film to like". However, the reviewer praised the ending of the film, which she describes as "achingly real" and "extraordinarily intense and effective". She also praised the film's young leads Shōta Sometani and Fumi Nikaidō, who she said "grow in stature as the film progresses".

Accolades

References

External links
  
 

2011 films
2011 drama films
2010s Japanese-language films
Japanese drama films
Japanese serial killer films
Films directed by Sion Sono
Films about the 2011 Tōhoku earthquake and tsunami
Live-action films based on manga
Patricide in fiction
2010s Japanese films